The first version of this article has been based in the text of :el:Βασίλης Στραβοπόδης of the Greek Wikipedia published under GFDL.

Vassilis Stravopodis (born 1948), popularly nicknamed The Wizard, is a former Greek footballer (midfielder) born in Patras. One of the most gifted midfielders of his generation, he was a member of the great Panachaiki football team that impressed Greece in the 1970s and qualified to the 1974 UEFA Cup.

After the end of his professional career, Stravopodis remained in Panachaiki as a valuable member of its organisation. He has been the junior team's coach for several years and has coached the senior team for some months in 2006.

Statistics
Vassilis Stravopodis had 228 First Division appearances with Panachaiki and scored 17 goals.

Appearances for the Greece national football team
 1. 15 May 1974 Poland - Greece 2–0 (starter 45') - friendly match
 2. 1974 Roumania - Greece 3–1 (substitute 75') - Balkan Cup

References

Rsssf, website about football statistics.

Notes 

1948 births
Panachaiki F.C. players
Greek footballers
Greece international footballers
Living people
Association football midfielders
Footballers from Patras